Hans Robert Bryner (19 March 1911 – 30 May 1988) was a Swiss sailor who competed in the 1948 Summer Olympics, in the 1952 Summer Olympics, in the 1960 Summer Olympics, and in the 1964 Summer Olympics.

References

1911 births
1988 deaths
Swiss male sailors (sport)
Olympic sailors of Switzerland
Sailors at the 1948 Summer Olympics – Star
Sailors at the 1952 Summer Olympics – Star
Sailors at the 1960 Summer Olympics – Star
Sailors at the 1964 Summer Olympics – Star
20th-century Swiss people